William Meyers Colmer (February 11, 1890 – September 9, 1980) was an American politician from Mississippi.

Colmer was born in Moss Point, Mississippi, and attended Millsaps College. He served in the military during World War I.

Colmer was elected Jackson County attorney in 1921, becoming district attorney in 1928.

In 1932, Colmer was elected to the House of Representatives as a Democrat from Mississippi's 6th District, located on the Gulf Coast. He was reelected 19 times.  His district was renumbered the 5th after the 1960 Census, when Mississippi's declining proportion of the US population due to the Great Migration cost it a congressional seat.

Originally elected as a supporter of President Franklin D. Roosevelt's New Deal, Colmer became increasingly conservative as the years passed. He became disenchanted as the national Democratic Party began to support the Civil Rights Movement. After the Brown v. Board of Education (1954) decision by the United States Supreme Court, ruling that public school segregation was unconstitutional, Colmer helped to get Southern Democratic congressmen to sign the "Southern Manifesto" declaring their resistance.

Colmer endorsed the unpledged electors slate in 1960, Republican Party presidential candidates Barry Goldwater in 1964, and Richard Nixon in 1972. Because of his seniority, he advanced to the position as chairman of the Rules Committee, serving from 1967 to 1973.
 
Colmer did not run for reelection in 1972. He endorsed his administrative assistant, Trent Lott, as his successor, although Lott ran as a Republican. Colmer served longer in the U.S. House of Representatives than anyone in Mississippi's history except Jamie Whitten, who served 54 years in Congress from 1941 to 1995. (Fellow Mississippian John Stennis would serve over 41 years in the U.S. Senate from late 1947 until early 1989.)

Note 
 Colmer Middle School in Pascagoula, Mississippi is named after William Colmer.

See also 
 Southern Democrats
 Conservative Democrat

References

External links
 

1890 births
1980 deaths
20th-century American politicians
Democratic Party members of the United States House of Representatives from Mississippi
District attorneys in Mississippi
People from Moss Point, Mississippi
American segregationists